In the mathematical area of geometric group theory, a Van Kampen diagram (sometimes also called a Lyndon–Van Kampen diagram )   is a planar diagram used to represent the fact that a particular word in the generators of a group given by a group presentation represents the identity element in that group.

History

The notion of a Van Kampen diagram was introduced by Egbert van Kampen in 1933. This paper appeared in the same issue of American Journal of Mathematics as another paper of Van Kampen, where he proved what is now known as the Seifert–Van Kampen theorem. The main result of the paper on Van Kampen diagrams, now known as the van Kampen lemma can be deduced from the Seifert–Van Kampen theorem by applying the latter to the presentation complex of a group. However, Van Kampen did not notice it at the time and this fact was only made explicit much later (see, e.g.). Van Kampen diagrams remained an underutilized tool in group theory for about thirty years, until the advent of the small cancellation theory in the 1960s, where Van Kampen diagrams play a central role. Currently Van Kampen diagrams are a standard tool in geometric group theory. They are used, in particular, for the study of isoperimetric functions in groups, and their various generalizations such as isodiametric functions, filling length functions, and so on.

Formal definition

The definitions and notations below largely follow Lyndon and Schupp.

Let 
   (†)
be a group presentation where all r∈R are cyclically reduced words in the free group F(A). The alphabet A and the set of defining relations R are often assumed to be finite, which corresponds to a finite group presentation, but this assumption is not necessary for the general definition of a Van Kampen diagram.  Let R∗ be the symmetrized closure of R, that is, let R∗ be obtained from R by adding all cyclic permutations of elements of R and of their inverses.

A Van Kampen diagram over the presentation (†) is a planar finite cell complex , given with a specific embedding  with the following additional data and satisfying the following additional properties:

The complex  is connected and simply connected.

By the choice of R∗ Condition 4 is equivalent to requiring that for each region of   there is some boundary vertex of that region and some choice of direction (clockwise or counter-clockwise) such that the boundary label of the region read from that vertex and in that direction is freely reduced and belongs to R.

Further terminology

If no such pair of region exists,   is called reduced.

In general, a Van Kampen diagram has a "cactus-like" structure where one or more disk-components joined by (possibly degenerate) arcs, see the figure below:

Example

The following figure shows an example of a Van Kampen diagram for the free abelian group of rank two

The boundary label of this diagram is the word

The area of this diagram is equal to 8.

Van Kampen lemma

A key basic result in the theory is the so-called Van Kampen lemma which states the following:

Let  be a Van Kampen diagram over the presentation (†) with boundary label w which is a word (not necessarily freely reduced) in the alphabet A ∪ A−1. Then w=1 in G. 
Let w be a freely reduced word in the alphabet A ∪ A−1 such that w=1 in G. Then there exists a reduced Van Kampen diagram  over the presentation (†) whose boundary label is freely reduced and is equal to w.

Sketch of the proof

First observe that for an element w ∈ F(A) we have w = 1 in G if and only if w belongs to the normal closure of R in F(A) that is, if and only if w can be represented as

   (♠)

where n ≥ 0 and where si ∈ R∗ for i = 1, ..., n.

The proof of part two of Van Kampen's lemma is more involved. First, it is easy to see that if w is freely reduced and w = 1 in G there exists some Van Kampen diagram  with boundary label w0 such that w = w0 in F(A) (after possibly freely reducing w0). Namely consider a representation of w of the form (♠) above. Then make  to be a wedge of n "lollipops" with "stems" labeled by ui and with the "candys" (2-cells) labelled by si. However, it is possible that the word w0 is not freely reduced. One then starts performing "folding" moves to get a sequence of Van Kampen diagrams  by making their boundary labels more and more freely reduced and making sure that at each step the boundary label of each diagram in the sequence is equal to w in F(A). The sequence terminates in a finite number of steps with a Van Kampen diagram  whose boundary label is freely reduced and thus equal to w as a word. The diagram  may not be reduced. If that happens, we can remove the reduction pairs from this diagram by a simple surgery operation without affecting the boundary label. Eventually this produces a reduced Van Kampen diagram  whose boundary cycle is freely reduced and equal to w.

Strengthened version of Van Kampen's lemma
Moreover, the above proof shows that the conclusion of Van Kampen's lemma can be strengthened as follows. Part 1 can be strengthened to say that if  is a Van Kampen diagram of area n with boundary label w then there exists a representation (♠) for w as a product in F(A) of exactly n conjugates of elements of R∗.  Part 2 can be strengthened to say that if w is freely reduced and admits a representation (♠) as a product in F(A) of n conjugates of elements of R∗ then there exists a reduced Van Kampen diagram with boundary label w and of area at most n.

Dehn functions and isoperimetric functions

Area of a word representing the identity
Let w ∈ F(A) be such that w = 1 in G. Then the area of w, denoted Area(w), is defined as the minimum of the areas of all Van Kampen diagrams with boundary labels w (Van Kampen's lemma says that at least one such diagram exists).

One can show that the area of w can be equivalently defined as the smallest n≥0 such that there exists a representation (♠) expressing w as a product in F(A) of n conjugates of the defining relators.

Isoperimetric functions and Dehn functions

A nonnegative monotone nondecreasing function f(n) is said to be an isoperimetric function for presentation (†)  if for every freely reduced word w such that w = 1 in G we have

where |w| is the length of the word w.

Suppose now that the alphabet A in (†) is finite.
Then the Dehn function of (†) is defined as

It is easy to see that Dehn(n) is an isoperimetric function for (†) and, moreover, if f(n) is any other isoperimetric function for (†) then Dehn(n) ≤ f(n) for every n ≥ 0.

Let w ∈ F(A) be a freely reduced word such that w = 1 in G. A Van Kampen diagram  with boundary label w is called minimal if   Minimal Van Kampen diagrams are discrete analogues of minimal surfaces in Riemannian geometry.

Generalizations and other applications

There are several generalizations of van-Kampen diagrams where instead of being planar, connected and simply connected (which means being homotopically equivalent to a disk) the diagram is drawn on or homotopically equivalent to some other surface. It turns out, that there is a close connection between the geometry of the surface and certain  group theoretical notions. Annular diagrams, also known as conjugacy diagrams, can be used to represent conjugacy in groups given by group presentations. Also spherical Van Kampen diagrams are related to  several versions of group-theoretic asphericity and to Whitehead's asphericity conjecture, Van Kampen diagrams on the torus are related to commuting elements, diagrams on the real projective plane are related to involutions in the group and diagrams on Klein's bottle are related to elements that are conjugated to their own inverse.
Van Kampen diagrams are central objects in the small cancellation theory developed by Greendlinger, Lyndon and Schupp in the 1960s-1970s. Small cancellation theory deals with group presentations where the defining relations have "small overlaps" with each other. This condition is reflected in the geometry of reduced Van Kampen diagrams over small cancellation presentations, forcing certain kinds of non-positively curved or negatively cn curved behavior. This behavior yields useful information about algebraic and algorithmic properties of small cancellation groups, in particular regarding the word and the conjugacy problems. Small cancellation theory was one of the key precursors of geometric group theory, that emerged as a distinct mathematical area in the late 1980s and it remains an important part of geometric group theory.
Van Kampen diagrams play a key role in the theory of word-hyperbolic groups introduced by Gromov in 1987. In particular, it turns out that a finitely presented group is word-hyperbolic if and only if it satisfies a linear isoperimetric inequality. Moreover, there is an isoperimetric gap in the possible spectrum of isoperimetric functions for finitely presented groups: for any finitely presented group either it is hyperbolic and satisfies a linear isoperimetric inequality or else the Dehn function is at least quadratic.
The study of isoperimetric functions for finitely presented groups has become an important general theme in geometric group theory where substantial progress has occurred. Much work has gone into constructing groups with "fractional" Dehn functions (that is, with Dehn functions being polynomials of non-integer degree). The work of Rips, Ol'shanskii, Birget and Sapir explored the connections between Dehn functions and time complexity functions of Turing machines and showed that an arbitrary "reasonable" time function can be realized (up to appropriate equivalence) as the Dehn function of some finitely presented group.
Various stratified and relativized versions of Van Kampen diagrams have been explored in the subject as well. In particular, a stratified version of small cancellation theory, developed by Ol'shanskii, resulted in constructions of various group-theoretic "monsters", such as the Tarski Monster, and in geometric solutions of the Burnside problem for periodic groups of large exponent. Relative versions of Van Kampen diagrams (with respect to a collection of subgroups) were used by Osin to develop an isoperimetric function approach to the theory of relatively hyperbolic groups.

See also

Geometric group theory
Presentation of a group
Seifert–Van Kampen theorem

Basic references

Alexander Yu. Ol'shanskii. Geometry of defining relations in groups. Translated from the 1989 Russian original by Yu. A. Bakhturin. Mathematics and its Applications (Soviet Series), 70. Kluwer Academic Publishers Group, Dordrecht, 1991. 
Roger C. Lyndon and Paul E. Schupp. Combinatorial Group Theory. Springer-Verlag, New York, 2001. "Classics in Mathematics" series, reprint of the 1977 edition. ; Ch. V. Small Cancellation Theory. pp. 235–294.

Footnotes

External links
Van Kampen diagrams from the files of David A. Jackson

Geometric group theory
Group theory
Combinatorics on words
Diagrams